Joseph Rodney Moss (July 15, 1903 – April 20, 1993) was an associate justice and chief justice on the South Carolina Supreme Court.

In 1941, he was elected to the South Carolina Senate. In 1948, he became a trial court judge. He was chosen as an associate justice of the South Carolina Supreme Court in 1956.  He was chosen as chief justice of the court in 1966.  He remained chief justice until he retired in 1975.  During that time, he supervised the relocation of the Supreme Court from the South Carolina State House to its current location on Gervais Street. The South Carolina unified court system was created while he served on the high court.

After retiring, he served as a special trial court judge. In 1985, he created controversy by saying "damn niggers" from the bench into a microphone that he may have thought was turned off.  He had been referring to a group of black protestors who were displeased about the conviction of a black man for the killing of a white man in Pendleton, South Carolina. The York County Justice Center was named in his honor over the objections of the NAACP.

Personal life
He married Rosa Dill in 1931, they had no children and she died in 1966.

References

Chief Justices of the South Carolina Supreme Court
Justices of the South Carolina Supreme Court
1903 births
People from York County, South Carolina
1993 deaths
Place of death missing
20th-century American judges